Pahra was a jagir in India during the British Raj. It was under the Bundelkhand Agency of the Central India Agency until 1896 when it was transferred to the Baghelkhand Agency. It was later transferred back to the Bundelkhand Agency.

Pahra had an area of 69.92 km2. In 1931 the population of the small state was of 3,496 inhabitants distributed in 31 villages. The principality was merged into the Indian state of Vindhya Pradesh in 1948 and is now part of the present-day state of Madhya Pradesh.

History
Pahra was founded in 1812 when a sanad was granted to Sālig Rām Chaube, son of Rām Kishan of Kalinjar, confirming him in the possession of the territory. It was one of the Chaube Jagirs of the area. The state was centered in the small town of Chaubepur (Chobepur), which had a population of 878 in 1901.

Rulers
Pahra's rulers were descendants of Ram Krishna Chaube, the Kiladar —governor of the fort— of Kalinjar.

1812 - ....             Chaube Sālig Rām
.... - 1868             Chaube Maksudan Prasad
1868 - ....             Chaube Radha Charan (was invested with full ruling powers in 1879)

See also
 Political integration of India

References

Satna district
Princely states of Madhya Pradesh